Lithium chloride is a chemical compound with the formula LiCl. The salt is a typical ionic compound (with certain covalent characteristics), although the small size of the Li+ ion gives rise to properties not seen for other alkali metal chlorides, such as extraordinary solubility in polar solvents (83.05 g/100 mL of water at 20 °C) and its hygroscopic properties.

Chemical properties

The salt forms crystalline hydrates, unlike the other alkali metal chlorides.  Mono-, tri-, and pentahydrates are known.  The anhydrous salt can be regenerated by heating the hydrates. LiCl also absorbs up to four equivalents of ammonia/mol. As with any other ionic chloride, solutions of lithium chloride can serve as a source of chloride ion, e.g., forming a precipitate upon treatment with silver nitrate:
 LiCl + AgNO3  →  AgCl + LiNO3

Preparation
Lithium chloride is produced by treatment of lithium carbonate with hydrochloric acid. Anhydrous LiCl is prepared from the hydrate by heating in a stream of hydrogen chloride.

Uses

Commercial applications
LiCl is also used as a brazing flux for aluminium in automobile parts. It is used as a desiccant for drying air streams. In more specialized applications, lithium chloride finds some use in organic synthesis, e.g., as an additive in the Stille reaction. Also, in biochemical applications, it can be used to precipitate RNA from cellular extracts.

Lithium chloride is also used as a flame colorant to produce dark red flames.

Niche uses
Lithium chloride is used as a relative humidity standard in the calibration of hygrometers.  At  a saturated solution (45.8%) of the salt will yield an equilibrium relative humidity of 11.30%. Additionally, lithium chloride can be used as a hygrometer. This deliquescent salt forms a self-solution when exposed to air.  The equilibrium LiCl concentration in the resulting solution is directly related to the relative humidity of the air. The percent relative humidity at  can be estimated, with minimal error in the range , from the following first-order equation: RH=107.93-2.11C, where C is solution LiCl concentration, percent by mass.

Molten LiCl is used for the preparation of carbon nanotubes, graphene and lithium niobate.

Lithium chloride has been shown to have strong acaricidal properties, being effective against Varroa destructor in populations of honey bees.

Lithium chloride is used as an aversive agent in lab animals to study conditioned place preference and aversion.

Precautions
Lithium salts affect the central nervous system in a variety of ways. While the citrate, carbonate, and orotate salts are currently used to treat bipolar disorder, other lithium salts including the chloride were used in the past. For a short time in the 1940s lithium chloride was manufactured as a salt substitute for people with hypertension, but this was prohibited after the toxic effects of the compound (tremors, fatigue, nausea) were recognized. It was, however, noted by J. H. Talbott that many symptoms attributed to lithium chloride toxicity may have also been attributable to sodium chloride deficiency, to the diuretics often administered to patients who were given lithium chloride, or to the patients' underlying conditions.

See also
Lithium chloride (data page)
Solubility table

References

 Handbook of Chemistry and Physics, 71st edition, CRC Press, Ann Arbor, Michigan, 1990.
 N. N. Greenwood, A. Earnshaw, Chemistry of the Elements, 2nd ed., Butterworth-Heinemann, Oxford, UK, 1997.
 R. Vatassery, titration analysis of LiCl, sat'd in Ethanol by AgNO3 to precipitate AgCl(s). EP of this titration gives %Cl by mass.
 H. Nechamkin, The Chemistry of the Elements, McGraw-Hill, New York, 1968.

External links
Radiochemical measurements of activity coefficients, from Betts & MacKenzie, Can. J. Chem. 

Chlorides
Alkali metal chlorides
Lithium salts
Metal halides
Mood stabilizers
Desiccants
Rock salt crystal structure